Claudio de Curtis (died 1595) was a Roman Catholic prelate who served as Bishop of Crotone (1591–1595).

Biography
On 3 November 1591, Claudio de Curtis was appointed during the papacy of Pope Innocent IX as Bishop of Crotone. On 16 February 1592, he was consecrated bishop by Giulio Antonio Santorio, Cardinal-Priest of San Bartolomeo all'Isola with Flaminio Filonardi, Bishop of Aquino, and Leonard Abel, Titular Bishop of Sidon, serving as co-consecrators. He served as Bishop of Crotone until his death in 1595.

References

External links and additional sources
 (for Chronology of Bishops) 
 (for Chronology of Bishops) 

16th-century Italian Roman Catholic bishops
Bishops appointed by Pope Innocent IX
1595 deaths